Karmen Bruus (born 24 January 2005) is an Estonian athlete who competes in the high jump. At the age of 17, she won the gold medal at the 2022 World Athletics Under-20 Championships. Her personal best result for high jump (1.96 m) is the Estonian record and world U18 best.

International competitions

Personal bests

Seasonal bests by year

2019 – 1.73
2020 – 1.74
2021 – 1.80
2022 – 1.96

References

External links
 

2005 births
Living people
People from Harku Parish
Estonian female high jumpers
World Athletics Championships athletes for Estonia
21st-century Estonian women
World Athletics U20 Championships winners